The 2008 ECAC Hockey Men's Ice Hockey Tournament was the 47th tournament in league history. It was played between March 7 and March 22, 2008. First Round and Quarterfinal games were played at home team campus sites, while the final four games were played at the Times Union Center in Albany, New York. By winning the tournament, Princeton received the ECAC Hockey automatic bid to the 2008 NCAA Division I Men's Ice Hockey Tournament.

Format
The tournament featured four rounds of play. The teams that finish above fifth place in the standings receive a bye to the quarterfinal round. In the first round, the fifth and twelfth seeds, the sixth and eleventh seeds, the seventh and tenth seeds and the eighth and ninth seeds played a best-of-three series with the winners advancing to the quarterfinals. In the quarterfinals the one seed plays the lowest remaining seed, the second seed plays the second-lowest remaining seed, the third seed plays the third-lowest remaining seed and the fourth seed plays the fourth-lowest remaining seed another best-of-three series with the winners of these the series advancing to the Semifinals. In the semifinals the top remaining seed plays the lowest remaining seed while the two remaining teams play against each other. The winners of the semifinals play in the championship game while the losers play in a third-place game. All series after the quarterfinals are single-elimination games. The tournament champion receives an automatic bid to the 2008 NCAA Men's Division I Ice Hockey Tournament.

Conference standings
Note: GP = Games played; W = Wins; L = Losses; T = Ties; PTS = Points; GF = Goals For; GA = Goals Against

Bracket
Teams are reseeded after the First Round and Quarterfinals

Note: * denotes overtime period(s)

First round

(5) Cornell vs. (12) Dartmouth

(6) Quinnipiac vs. (11) Brown

(7) Yale vs. (10) Rensselaer

(8) Colgate vs. (9) St. Lawrence

Quarterfinals

(1) Clarkson vs. (8) Colgate

(2) Princeton vs. (7) Yale

(3) Harvard vs. (6) Quinnipiac

(4) Union vs. (5) Cornell

Semifinals

(2) Princeton vs. (8) Colgate

(3) Harvard vs. (5) Cornell

Third place

(5) Cornell vs. (8) Colgate

Championship

(2) Princeton vs. (3) Harvard

Tournament awards

All-Tournament Team
F Mike Kennedy (Cornell)
F Kevin Lohry* (Princeton)
F Jon Pelle (Harvard)
D Alex Biega (Harvard)
D Mike Moore (Princeton)
G Zane Kalemba* (Princeton)
* Most Outstanding Player(s)

References

External links
ECAC Hockey

ECAC Hockey Men's Ice Hockey Tournament
ECAC tournament